Lauren Dark is a British film producer. She produced Beast the debut film of director Michael Pearce and was nominated for two BAFTA awards. She won the BAFTA for Outstanding Debut by a Writer, Director or Producer in 2019. In 2021 she co-founded Aluna Entertainment with Vanessa Kirby. Dark worked at Ken Loach and Rebecca O'Brien's production company Sixteen Films for five years.

References 

Year of birth missing (living people)
Living people
British film producers